The yazheng (simplified: 轧筝; traditional: 軋箏; pinyin: zházhēng; also spelled zha zheng or zha cheng) is a Chinese string instrument. It is a traditional zither similar to the guzheng but bowed by scraping with a sorghum stem dusted with resin, a horsehair bow, or a piece of forsythia wood (sometimes yazheng can plucked). The musical instrument was popular in the Tang Dynasty, but is today little used except in the folk music of some parts of northern China, where it is called yaqin (simplified: 轧琴; traditional: 軋琴).

Playing
The zhazheng is generally played while seated on the floor. It has a tone similar to that of a viola, but raspier. Some contemporary players prefer to use an actual horsehair bow rather than a stick, believing the sound to be smoother. The instrument is used in court, aristocratic, and folk music, as well as in contemporary classical music and film scores.

The Korean ajaeng (hangul: 아쟁; hanja: 牙箏) is derived from the yazheng.

In 2002, the People's Republic of China released a postage stamp featuring the instrument.

The zhengni (筝尼) is a similar instrument used by the Zhuang people of the southern Chinese region of Guangxi. After passing to Japan,it became a Assō (nihongo: 軋箏,
hiragana: あっそう) and Ryukyu, Japan, it became a teisō
(nihongo: 提箏,
hiragana: ていそう). In Vietnam, it became a nha tranh in Nhã nhạc.

See also
Guzheng
Traditional Chinese musical instruments

References

External links
Yazheng page (Chinese)
Ya qin page

Videos
轧琴 (bowed zither) from China
夢裏相思
金鳳凰
黃福安 - 文枕琴
- 箏族魅力系列 (2)

Bowed string instruments
Zithers
Chinese musical instruments